The Church of Bethphage, also spelled Beitphage, meaning "house of the early figs", is a Franciscan church located on the Mount of Olives in Jerusalem. It contains a stone traditionally identified as the one which Jesus used to mount the donkey at the start of his procession into Jerusalem.

History

The modern church, built in 1883, rests on the foundations of a 12th-century crusader chapel which was located in the ancient village of Bethphage, which is now a part of Jerusalem, but two thousand years ago would have been a separate village between Bethany and Jerusalem. The crusader era chapel itself was built on the foundations of a 4th-century Byzantine shrine commemorating the meeting between Lazarus' sister Martha and Jesus, after Lazarus had died. In 1867, during construction of a Franciscan monastery on the grounds, a stone, cube shaped and covered in plaster, was discovered. This stone, now called the Stele of Bethphage, was an integral part of the 12th century crusader chapel and now lies near the northern wall of the church. The Crusaders had decorated the stone and inscribed upon it in Latin, descriptions of biblical events which occurred in the area of Jerusalem and Bethphage. In 1950 the decorations on the stone were restored and five years later, in 1955 frescos were drawn on the walls and ceiling of the sanctuary. Today, as in the 12th century, pilgrims hold a Palm Sunday procession which begins at the Bethphage Church.

Design and Layout

Foundations from the crusader chapel can easily be seen near the floor of the apse. Behind the altar is a fresco depicting Jesus riding a donkey to the Temple, accompanied by his disciples. The church ceiling features drawings of flowers and leaves. Colored in shades of brown, the wall frescos portray New Testament era people preparing for the procession. Written in Latin around the windows are the words which the people said about Jesus during the procession into the city. The main focus of the church is the Stele of Bethphage, which is set apart by wrought iron railings. There is a mirror behind the stone so that visitors can easily see the drawings on all four sides. The drawings depict the meeting between Jesus and Martha; two disciples bringing Jesus an ass and a colt, Lazarus rising from the dead, and on the side facing the altar, a drawing of a crowd of people holding palms.

Notes

References
 The Holy Land

Bethphage
Franciscan churches in Israel
Roman Catholic churches completed in 1883
19th-century Roman Catholic church buildings in Israel